Power Play is a Canadian public affairs television program which airs weekdays on CTV News Channel. Interviews are conducted with important Canadian political figures as well as political journalists and strategists. The program broadcasts from Parliament Hill, and debuted on February 2, 2009.

Its original host was Tom Clark; upon his departure from the network in September 2010, it was hosted on a week-by-week basis by various Bell Media journalists, including Jane Taber and Roger Smith, until CTV announced that Don Martin, a newspaper columnist, would become the new host of Power Play starting in mid-December 2010. His retirement from the program was announced in November 2019, with the program to be taken over by Evan Solomon Mondays to Thursdays and Joyce Napier on Fridays. Solomon left the show in October 2022 for a publishing role in New York City; in November 2022, Vassy Kapelos was announced as his successor.

Power Play is the permanent successor to Mike Duffy Live, which aired until December 2008 when Mike Duffy, the host, was appointed to the Senate of Canada. Following the departure of Duffy, a program called On the Hill, hosted by Graham Richardson, ran for one month until Power Play premiered.

References

External links

2000s Canadian television news shows
2010s Canadian television news shows
2020s Canadian television news shows
2009 Canadian television series debuts
2000s Canadian television talk shows
Television series by Bell Media
Canadian political television series